The 1960 United States House of Representatives elections was an election for the United States House of Representatives on November 8, 1960, to elect members to serve in the 87th United States Congress. They coincided with the election of President John F. Kennedy and was the first house election to feature all 50 current U.S. states.

There were 437 seats, the most in U.S. history: 435 from the reapportionment in accordance with the 1950 census, and one seat for each of the new states of Alaska and Hawaii.

Although Democrats retained control, it was the first time since 1908 that an incoming president's party lost seats in the House, which would not happen again until 1988.

Overall results

Source: Election Statistics - Office of the Clerk

Special elections 
In these special elections, the winner was seated during 1960 or before January 3, 1961; ordered by election date, then state, then district.

|-
! 
| Isidore Dollinger
|  | Democratic
| 1948
|  | Incumbent resigned December 31, 1959 to become District Attorney of Bronx County.New member elected March 8, 1960.Democratic hold.Winner was subsequently re-elected in November, see below.
| nowrap | 

|-
! 
| Alvin Bush
|  | Republican
| 1950
|  | Incumbent died November 3, 1959.New member elected April 26, 1960.Republican hold.Winner was subsequently re-elected in November, see below.
| nowrap | 

|-
! 
| Richard M. Simpson
|  | Republican
| 1936
|  | Incumbent died January 7, 1960.New member elected April 26, 1960.Republican hold.Winner subsequently died June 19, 1960, and the seat remained vacant until another special election in November, see below.
| nowrap | 

|-
! 
| David McKee Hall
|  | Democratic
| 1958
|  | Incumbent died January 29, 1960.New member elected June 25, 1960.Democratic hold.Winner was subsequently re-elected in November, see below.
| nowrap | 

|-
! 
| James G. Polk
|  | Democratic
| 19301940 1948
|  | Incumbent died April 28, 1959.New member elected November 8, 1960.Republican gain.Winner was not a candidate the same day to the next term, see below.
| nowrap | 

|-
! 
| Douglas Elliott
|  | Republican
| 1960 
|  | Incumbent died June 19, 1960.New member elected November 8, 1960.Republican hold.Winner was also elected to the full term, see below.
| nowrap | 

|-
! 
| Russell V. Mack
|  | Republican
| 1947 , 1948
|  | Incumbent died March 28, 1960.New member elected November 8, 1960.Democratic gain.Winner was also elected to the full term, see below.
| nowrap | 

|}

Alabama 

|-
! 
| Frank W. Boykin
|  | Democratic
| 1935 
| Incumbent re-elected.
| nowrap | 

|-
! 
| George M. Grant
|  | Democratic
| 1938
| Incumbent re-elected.
| nowrap | 

|-
! 
| George W. Andrews
|  | Democratic
| 1944
| Incumbent re-elected.
| nowrap | 

|-
! 
| Kenneth A. Roberts
|  | Democratic
| 1950
| Incumbent re-elected.
| nowrap | 

|-
! 
| Albert Rains
|  | Democratic
| 1944
| Incumbent re-elected.
| nowrap | 

|-
! 
| Armistead I. Selden Jr.
|  | Democratic
| 1952
| Incumbent re-elected.
| nowrap | 

|-
! 
| Carl Elliott
|  | Democratic
| 1948
| Incumbent re-elected.
| nowrap | 

|-
! 
| Robert E. Jones Jr.
|  | Democratic
| 1947 
| Incumbent re-elected.
| nowrap | 

|-
! 
| George Huddleston Jr.
|  | Democratic
| 1954
| Incumbent re-elected.
| nowrap | 

|}

Alaska 

|-
! 
| Ralph Julian Rivers
|  | Democratic
| 1958
| Incumbent re-elected.
| nowrap | 

|}

Arizona 

|-
! 
| John Jacob Rhodes
|  | Republican
| 1952
| Incumbent re-elected.
| nowrap | 

|-
! 
| Stewart Lee Udall
|  | Democratic
| 1954
| Incumbent re-elected.
| nowrap | 

|}

Arkansas 

|-
! 
| Ezekiel C. Gathings
|  | Democratic
| 1938
| Incumbent re-elected.
| nowrap | 

|-
! 
| Wilbur Mills
|  | Democratic
| 1938
| Incumbent re-elected.
| nowrap | 

|-
! 
| James William Trimble
|  | Democratic
| 1944
| Incumbent re-elected.
| nowrap | 

|-
! 
| Oren Harris
|  | Democratic
| 1940
| Incumbent re-elected.
| nowrap | 

|-
! 
| Dale Alford
|  | Democratic
| 1958
| Incumbent re-elected.
| nowrap | 

|-
! 
| William F. Norrell
|  | Democratic
| 1938
| Incumbent re-elected.
| nowrap | 

|}

California 

|-
! 
| Clement Woodnutt Miller
|  | Democratic
| 1958
| Incumbent re-elected.
| nowrap | 

|-
! 
| Harold T. Johnson
|  | Democratic
| 1958
| Incumbent re-elected.
| nowrap | 

|-
! 
| John E. Moss
|  | Democratic
| 1952
| Incumbent re-elected.
| nowrap | 

|-
! 
| William S. Mailliard
|  | Republican
| 1952
| Incumbent re-elected.
| nowrap | 

|-
! 
| John F. Shelley
|  | Democratic
| 1949 
| Incumbent re-elected.
| nowrap | 

|-
! 
| John F. Baldwin Jr.
|  | Republican
| 1954
| Incumbent re-elected.
| nowrap | 

|-
! 
| Jeffery Cohelan
|  | Democratic
| 1958
| Incumbent re-elected.
| nowrap | 

|-
! 
| George P. Miller
|  | Democratic
| 1944
| Incumbent re-elected.
| nowrap | 

|-
! 
| J. Arthur Younger
|  | Republican
| 1952
| Incumbent re-elected.
| nowrap | 

|-
! 
| Charles S. Gubser
|  | Republican
| 1952
| Incumbent re-elected.
| nowrap | 

|-
! 
| John J. McFall
|  | Democratic
| 1956
| Incumbent re-elected.
| nowrap | 

|-
! 
| B. F. Sisk
|  | Democratic
| 1954
| Incumbent re-elected.
| nowrap | 

|-
! 
| Charles M. Teague
|  | Republican
| 1954
| Incumbent re-elected.
| nowrap | 

|-
! 
| Harlan Hagen
|  | Democratic
| 1952
| Incumbent re-elected.
| nowrap | 

|-
! 
| Gordon L. McDonough
|  | Republican
| 1944
| Incumbent re-elected.
| nowrap | 

|-
! 
| Donald L. Jackson
|  | Republican
| 1946
|  | Incumbent retired.New member elected.Republican hold.
| nowrap | 

|-
! 
| Cecil R. King
|  | Democratic
| 1942
| Incumbent re-elected.
| nowrap | 

|-
! 
| Craig Hosmer
|  | Republican
| 1952
| Incumbent re-elected.
| nowrap | 

|-
! 
| Chet Holifield
|  | Democratic
| 1942
| Incumbent re-elected.
| nowrap | 

|-
! 
| H. Allen Smith
|  | Republican
| 1956
| Incumbent re-elected.
| nowrap | 

|-
! 
| Edgar W. Hiestand
|  | Republican
| 1952
| Incumbent re-elected.
| nowrap | 

|-
! 
| Joseph F. Holt
|  | Republican
| 1952
|  | Incumbent retired.New member elected.Democratic gain.
| nowrap | 

|-
! 
| Clyde Doyle
|  | Democratic
| 1948
| Incumbent re-elected.
| nowrap | 

|-
! 
| Glenard P. Lipscomb
|  | Republican
| 1953
| Incumbent re-elected.
| nowrap | 

|-
! 
| George A. Kasem
|  | Democratic
| 1958
|  | Incumbent lost re-election.New member elected.Republican gain.
| nowrap | 

|-
! 
| James Roosevelt
|  | Democratic
| 1954
| Incumbent re-elected.
| nowrap | 

|-
! 
| Harry R. Sheppard
|  | Democratic
| 1936
| Incumbent re-elected.
| nowrap | 

|-
! 
| James B. Utt
|  | Republican
| 1952
| Incumbent re-elected.
| nowrap | 

|-
! 
| Dalip Singh Saund
|  | Democratic
| 1956
| Incumbent re-elected.
| nowrap | 

|-
! 
| Bob Wilson
|  | Republican
| 1952
| Incumbent re-elected.
| nowrap | 

|}

Colorado 

|-
! 
| Byron G. Rogers
|  | Democratic
| 1950
| Incumbent re-elected.
| nowrap | 

|-
! 
| Byron L. Johnson
|  | Democratic
| 1958
|  | Incumbent lost re-election.New member elected.Republican gain.
| nowrap | 

|-
! 
| John Chenoweth
|  | Republican
| 1950
| Incumbent re-elected.
| nowrap | 

|-
! 
| Wayne N. Aspinall
|  | Democratic
| 1948
| Incumbent re-elected.
| nowrap | 

|}

Connecticut 

|-
! 
| Emilio Q. Daddario
|  | Democratic
| 1958
| Incumbent re-elected.
| nowrap | 

|-
! 
| Chester Bowles
|  | Democratic
| 1958
|  | Incumbent retired.New member elected.Republican gain.
| nowrap | 

|-
! 
| Robert Giaimo
|  | Democratic
| 1958
| Incumbent re-elected.
| nowrap | 

|-
! 
| Donald J. Irwin
|  | Democratic
| 1958
|  | Incumbent lost re-election.New member elected.Republican gain.
| nowrap | 

|-
! 
| John S. Monagan
|  | Democratic
| 1958
| Incumbent re-elected.
| nowrap | 

|-
! 
| Frank Kowalski
|  | Democratic
| 1958
| Incumbent re-elected.
| nowrap | 

|}

Delaware 

|-
! 
| Harris McDowell
|  | Democratic
| 1958
| Incumbent re-elected.
| nowrap | 

|}

Florida 

|-
! 
| William C. Cramer
|  | Republican
| 1954
| Incumbent re-elected.
| nowrap | 

|-
! 
| Charles E. Bennett
|  | Democratic
| 1948
| Incumbent re-elected.
| nowrap | 

|-
! 
| Bob Sikes
|  | Democratic
| 19401944 1974
| Incumbent re-elected.
| nowrap | 

|-
! 
| Dante Fascell
|  | Democratic
| 1954
| Incumbent re-elected.
| nowrap | 

|-
! 
| Syd Herlong
|  | Democratic
| 1948
| Incumbent re-elected.
| nowrap | 

|-
! 
| Paul Rogers
|  | Democratic
| 1954
| Incumbent re-elected.
| nowrap | 

|-
! 
| James A. Haley
|  | Democratic
| 1952
| Incumbent re-elected.
| nowrap | 

|-
! 
| Donald Ray Matthews
|  | Democratic
| 1952
| Incumbent re-elected.
| nowrap | 

|}

Georgia 

|-
! 
| Prince Hulon Preston Jr.
|  | Democratic
| 1946
|  | Incumbent lost renomination.New member elected.Democratic hold.
| nowrap | 

|-
! 
| J. L. Pilcher
|  | Democratic
| 1953
| Incumbent re-elected.
| nowrap | 

|-
! 
| Tic Forrester
|  | Democratic
| 1950
| Incumbent re-elected.
| nowrap | 

|-
! 
| John Flynt
|  | Democratic
| 1954
| Incumbent re-elected.
| nowrap | 

|-
! 
| James C. Davis
|  | Democratic
| 1946
| Incumbent re-elected.
| nowrap | 

|-
! 
| Carl Vinson
|  | Democratic
| 1914
| Incumbent re-elected.
| nowrap | 

|-
! 
| Harlan Erwin Mitchell
|  | Democratic
| 1958
|  | Retired to run for Georgia State Senator.New member elected.Democratic hold.
| nowrap | 

|-
! 
| Iris Faircloth Blitch
|  | Democratic
| 1954
| Incumbent re-elected.
| nowrap | 

|-
! 
| Phillip M. Landrum
|  | Democratic
| 1952
| Incumbent re-elected.
| nowrap | 

|-
! 
| Paul Brown
|  | Democratic
| 1933
|  | Incumbent retired.New member elected.Democratic hold.
| nowrap | 

|}

Hawaii 

|-
! 
| Daniel Inouye
|  | Democratic
| 1959
| Incumbent re-elected.
| nowrap | 

|}

Idaho 

|-
! 
| Gracie Pfost
|  | Democratic
| 1952
| Incumbent re-elected.
| nowrap | 

|-
! 
| Hamer H. Budge
|  | Republican
| 1950
|  | Incumbent lost re-election.New member elected.Democratic gain.
| nowrap | 

|}

Illinois 

|-
! 
| William L. Dawson
|  | Democratic
| 1942
| Incumbent re-elected.
| nowrap | 

|-
! 
| Barratt O'Hara
|  | Democratic
| 19481950 1952
| Incumbent re-elected.
| nowrap | 

|-
! 
| William T. Murphy
|  | Democratic
| 1958
| Incumbent re-elected.
| nowrap | 

|-
! 
| Ed Derwinski
|  | Republican
| 1958
| Incumbent re-elected.
| nowrap | 

|-
! 
| John C. Kluczynski
|  | Democratic
| 1950
| Incumbent re-elected.
| nowrap | 

|-
! 
| Thomas J. O'Brien
|  | Democratic
| 1942
| Incumbent re-elected.
| nowrap | 

|-
! 
| Roland V. Libonati
|  | Democratic
| 1957
| Incumbent re-elected.
| nowrap | 

|-
! 
| Dan Rostenkowski
|  | Democratic
| 1958
| Incumbent re-elected.
| nowrap | 

|-
! 
| Sidney R. Yates
|  | Democratic
| 1948
| Incumbent re-elected.
| nowrap | 

|-
! 
| Harold R. Collier
|  | Republican
| 1956
| Incumbent re-elected.
| nowrap | 

|-
! 
| Roman Pucinski
|  | Democratic
| 1958
| Incumbent re-elected.
| nowrap | 

|-
! 
| Charles A. Boyle
|  | Democratic
| 1954
|  | Incumbent died November 4, 1959.New member elected.Democratic hold.
| nowrap | 

|-
! 
| Marguerite S. Church
|  | Republican
| 1950
| Incumbent re-elected.
| nowrap | 

|-
! 
| Elmer J. Hoffman
|  | Republican
| 1958
| Incumbent re-elected.
| nowrap | 

|-
! 
| Noah M. Mason
|  | Republican
| 1936
| Incumbent re-elected.
| nowrap | 

|-
! 
| Leo E. Allen
|  | Republican
| 1932
|  | Incumbent retired.New member elected.Republican hold.
| nowrap | 

|-
! 
| Leslie C. Arends
|  | Republican
| 1934
| Incumbent re-elected.
| nowrap | 

|-
! 
| Robert H. Michel
|  | Republican
| 1956
| Incumbent re-elected.
| nowrap | 

|-
! 
| Robert B. Chiperfield
|  | Republican
| 1938
| Incumbent re-elected.
| nowrap | 

|-
! 
| Edna O. Simpson
|  | Republican
| 1958
|  | Incumbent retired.New member elected.Republican hold.
| nowrap | 

|-
! 
| Peter F. Mack Jr.
|  | Democratic
| 1948
| Incumbent re-elected.
| nowrap | 

|-
! 
| William L. Springer
|  | Republican
| 1950
| Incumbent re-elected.
| nowrap | 

|-
! 
| George E. Shipley
|  | Democratic
| 1958
| Incumbent re-elected.
| nowrap | 

|-
! 
| Melvin Price
|  | Democratic
| 1944
| Incumbent re-elected.
| nowrap | 

|-
! 
| Kenneth J. Gray
|  | Democratic
| 1954
| Incumbent re-elected.
| nowrap | 

|}

Indiana 

|-
! 
| Ray Madden
|  | Democratic
| 1942
| Incumbent re-elected.
| nowrap | 

|-
! 
| Charles A. Halleck
|  | Republican
| 1935
| Incumbent re-elected.
| nowrap | 

|-
! 
| John Brademas
|  | Democratic
| 1958
| Incumbent re-elected.
| nowrap | 

|-
! 
| E. Ross Adair
|  | Republican
| 1950
| Incumbent re-elected.
| nowrap | 

|-
! 
| J. Edward Roush
|  | Democratic
| 1958
| Incumbent re-elected.
| nowrap | 

|-
! 
| Fred Wampler
|  | Democratic
| 1958
|  | Incumbent lost re-election.New member elected.Republican gain.
| nowrap | 

|-
! 
| William G. Bray
|  | Republican
| 1950
| Incumbent re-elected.
| nowrap | 

|-
! 
| Winfield K. Denton
|  | Democratic
| 1954
| Incumbent re-elected.
| nowrap | 

|-
! 
| Earl Hogan
|  | Democratic
| 1958
|  | Incumbent lost re-election.New member elected.Republican gain.
| nowrap | 

|-
! 
| Randall S. Harmon
|  | Democratic
| 1958
|  | Incumbent lost re-election.New member elected.Republican gain.
| nowrap | 

|-
! 
| Joseph W. Barr
|  | Democratic
| 1958
|  | Incumbent lost re-election.New member elected.Republican gain.
| nowrap | 

|}

Iowa 

|-
! 
| Fred Schwengel
|  | Republican
| 1954
| Incumbent re-elected.
| nowrap | 

|-
! 
| Leonard G. Wolf
|  | Democratic
| 1958
|  | Incumbent lost re-election.New member elected.Republican gain.
| nowrap | 

|-
! 
| H. R. Gross
|  | Republican
| 1948
| Incumbent re-elected.
| nowrap | 

|-
! 
| John Henry Kyl
|  | Republican
| 1959 
| Incumbent re-elected.
| nowrap | 

|-
! 
| Neal Edward Smith
|  | Democratic
| 1958
| Incumbent re-elected.
| nowrap | 

|-
! 
| Merwin Coad
|  | Democratic
| 1956
| Incumbent re-elected.
| nowrap | 

|-
! 
| Ben F. Jensen
|  | Republican
| 1938
| Incumbent re-elected.
| nowrap | 

|-
! 
| Charles B. Hoeven
|  | Republican
| 1942
| Incumbent re-elected.
| nowrap | 

|}

Kansas 

|-
! 
| William H. Avery
|  | Republican
| 1954
| Incumbent re-elected.
| nowrap | 

|-
! 
| Newell A. George
|  | Democratic
| 1958
|  | Incumbent lost re-election.New member elected.Republican gain.
| nowrap | 

|-
! 
| Denver David Hargis
|  | Democratic
| 1958
|  | Incumbent lost re-election.New member elected.Republican gain.
| nowrap | 

|-
! 
| Edward Herbert Rees
|  | Republican
| 1936
|  | Incumbent retired.New member elected.Republican hold.
| nowrap | 

|-
! 
| James Floyd Breeding
|  | Democratic
| 1956
| Incumbent re-elected.
| nowrap | 

|-
! 
| Wint Smith
|  | Republican
| 1946
|  | Incumbent retired.New member elected.Republican hold.
| nowrap | 

|}

Kentucky 

|-
! 
| Frank Stubblefield
|  | Democratic
| 1958
| Incumbent re-elected.
| nowrap | 

|-
! 
| William Natcher
|  | Democratic
| 1953 
| Incumbent re-elected.
| nowrap | 

|-
! 
| Frank W. Burke
|  | Democratic
| 1958
| Incumbent re-elected.
| nowrap | 

|-
! 
| Frank Chelf
|  | Democratic
| 1944
| Incumbent re-elected.
| nowrap | 

|-
! 
| Brent Spence
|  | Democratic
| 1930
| Incumbent re-elected.
| nowrap | 

|-
! 
| John C. Watts
|  | Democratic
| 1951 
| Incumbent re-elected.
| nowrap | 

|-
! 
| Carl D. Perkins
|  | Democratic
| 1948
| Incumbent re-elected.
| nowrap | 

|-
! 
| Eugene Siler
|  | Republican
| 1954
| Incumbent re-elected.
| nowrap | 

|}

Louisiana 

|-
! 
| F. Edward Hébert
|  | Democratic
| 1940
| Incumbent re-elected.
| nowrap | 

|-
! 
| Hale Boggs
|  | Democratic
| 19401942 1946
| Incumbent re-elected.
| nowrap | 

|-
! 
| Edwin E. Willis
|  | Democratic
| 1948
| Incumbent re-elected.
| nowrap | 

|-
! 
| Overton Brooks
|  | Democratic
| 1936
| Incumbent re-elected.
| nowrap | 

|-
! 
| Otto Passman
|  | Democratic
| 1946
| Incumbent re-elected.
| nowrap | 

|-
! 
| James H. Morrison
|  | Democratic
| 1942
| Incumbent re-elected.
| nowrap | 

|-
! 
| T. Ashton Thompson
|  | Democratic
| 1952
| Incumbent re-elected.
| nowrap | 

|-
! 
| Harold B. McSween
|  | Democratic
| 1958
| Incumbent Lost renomination, then replaced primary opponent Earl K. Long on the ballot after he died, Incumbent re-elected.
| nowrap | 

|}

Maine 

|-
! 
| James C. Oliver
|  | Democratic
| 1958
|  | Incumbent lost re-election.New member elected.Republican gain.
| nowrap | 

|-
! 
| Frank M. Coffin
|  | Democratic
| 1956
|  | Retired to run for GovernorNew member elected.Republican gain.
| nowrap | 

|-
! 
| Clifford McIntire
|  | Republican
| 1951
| Incumbent re-elected.
| nowrap | 

|}

Maryland 

|-
! 
| Thomas Francis Johnson
|  | Democratic
| 1958
| Incumbent re-elected.
| nowrap | 

|-
! 
| Daniel Brewster
|  | Democratic
| 1958
| Incumbent re-elected.
| nowrap | 

|-
! 
| Edward Garmatz
|  | Democratic
| 1947
| Incumbent re-elected.
| nowrap | 

|-
! 
| George Hyde Fallon
|  | Democratic
| 1944
| Incumbent re-elected.
| nowrap | 

|-
! 
| Richard Lankford
|  | Democratic
| 1954
| Incumbent re-elected.
| nowrap | 

|-
! 
| John R. Foley
|  | Democratic
| 1958
|  | Incumbent lost re-election.New member elected.Republican gain.
| nowrap | 

|-
! 
| Samuel Friedel
|  | Democratic
| 1952
| Incumbent re-elected.
| nowrap | 

|}

Massachusetts 

|-
! 
| Silvio O. Conte
|  | Republican
| 1958
| Incumbent re-elected.
| nowrap | 

|-
! 
| Edward Boland
|  | Democratic
| 1952
| Incumbent re-elected.
| nowrap | 

|-
! 
| Philip J. Philbin
|  | Democratic
| 1942
| Incumbent re-elected.
| nowrap | 

|-
! 
| Harold Donohue
|  | Democratic
| 1946
| Incumbent re-elected.
| nowrap | 

|-
! 
| Edith Nourse Rogers
|  | Republican
| 1925
|  | Incumbent died September 10, 1960.New member elected.Republican hold.
| nowrap | 

|-
! 
| William H. Bates
|  | Republican
| 1950
| Incumbent re-elected.
| nowrap | 

|-
! 
| Thomas J. Lane
|  | Democratic
| 1941
| Incumbent re-elected.
| nowrap | 

|-
! 
| Torbert Macdonald
|  | Democratic
| 1954
| Incumbent re-elected.
| nowrap | 

|-
! 
| Hastings Keith
|  | Republican
| 1958
| Incumbent re-elected.
| nowrap | 

|-
! 
| Laurence Curtis
|  | Republican
| 1952
| Incumbent re-elected.
| nowrap | 

|-
! 
| Tip O'Neill
|  | Democratic
| 1952
| Incumbent re-elected.
| nowrap | 

|-
! 
| John W. McCormack
|  | Democratic
| 1928
| Incumbent re-elected.
| nowrap | 

|-
! 
| James A. Burke
|  | Democratic
| 1958
| Incumbent re-elected.
| nowrap | 

|-
! 
| Joseph W. Martin Jr.
|  | Republican
| 1924
| Incumbent re-elected.
| nowrap | 

|}

Michigan 

|-
! 
| Thaddeus M. Machrowicz
|  | Democratic
| 1950
| Incumbent re-elected.
| nowrap | 

|-
! 
| George Meader
|  | Republican
| 1950
| Incumbent re-elected.
| nowrap | 

|-
! 
| August E. Johansen
|  | Republican
| 1954
| Incumbent re-elected.
| nowrap | 

|-
! 
| Clare E. Hoffman
|  | Republican
| 1934
| Incumbent re-elected.
| nowrap | 

|-
! 
| Gerald Ford
|  | Republican
| 1948
| Incumbent re-elected.
| nowrap | 

|-
! 
| Charles E. Chamberlain
|  | Republican
| 1956
| Incumbent re-elected.
| nowrap | 

|-
! 
| James G. O'Hara
|  | Democratic
| 1958
| Incumbent re-elected.
| nowrap | 

|-
! 
| Alvin Morell Bentley
|  | Republican
| 1952
|  | Retired to run for U.S. senatorNew member elected.Republican hold.
| nowrap | 

|-
! 
| Robert P. Griffin
|  | Republican
| 1956
| Incumbent re-elected.
| nowrap | 

|-
! 
| Elford Albin Cederberg
|  | Republican
| 1952
| Incumbent re-elected.
| nowrap | 

|-
! 
| Victor A. Knox
|  | Republican
| 1952
| Incumbent re-elected.
| nowrap | 

|-
! 
| John B. Bennett
|  | Republican
| 1946
| Incumbent re-elected.
| nowrap | 

|-
! 
| Charles Diggs
|  | Democratic
| 1954
| Incumbent re-elected.
| nowrap | 

|-
! 
| Louis C. Rabaut
|  | Democratic
| 1948
| Incumbent re-elected.
| nowrap | 

|-
! 
| John D. Dingell Jr.
|  | Democratic
| 1955 
| Incumbent re-elected.
| nowrap | 

|-
! 
| John Lesinski Jr.
|  | Democratic
| 1932
| Incumbent re-elected.
| nowrap | 

|-
! 
| Martha W. Griffiths
|  | Democratic
| 1954
| Incumbent re-elected.
| nowrap | 

|-
! 
| William Broomfield
|  | Republican
| 1956
| Incumbent re-elected.
| nowrap | 

|}

Minnesota 

|-
! 
| Al Quie
|  | Republican
| 1958
| Incumbent re-elected.
| nowrap | 

|-
! 
| Ancher Nelsen
|  | Republican
| 1958
| Incumbent re-elected.
| nowrap | 

|-
! 
| Roy Wier
|  | Democratic
| 1948
|  | Incumbent lost re-election.New member elected.Republican gain.
| nowrap | 

|-
! 
| Joseph Karth
|  | Democratic
| 1958
| Incumbent re-elected.
| nowrap | 

|-
! 
| Walter Judd
|  | Republican
| 1942
| Incumbent re-elected.
| nowrap | 

|-
! 
| Fred Marshall
|  | Democratic
| 1948
| Incumbent re-elected.
| nowrap | 

|-
! 
| Herman Carl Andersen
|  | Republican
| 1938
| Incumbent re-elected.
| nowrap | 

|-
! 
| John Blatnik
|  | Democratic
| 1946
| Incumbent re-elected.
| nowrap | 

|-
! 
| Odin Langen
|  | Republican
| 1958
| Incumbent re-elected.
| nowrap | 

|}

Mississippi 

|-
! 
| Thomas Abernethy
|  | Democratic
| 1942
| Incumbent re-elected.
| nowrap | 

|-
! 
| Jamie Whitten
|  | Democratic
| 1941
| Incumbent re-elected.
| nowrap | 

|-
! 
| Frank Ellis Smith
|  | Democratic
| 1950
| Incumbent re-elected.
| nowrap | 

|-
! 
| John Bell Williams
|  | Democratic
| 1946
| Incumbent re-elected.
| nowrap | 

|-
! 
| W. Arthur Winstead
|  | Democratic
| 1942
| Incumbent re-elected.
| nowrap | 

|-
! 
| William M. Colmer
|  | Democratic
| 1932
| Incumbent re-elected.
| nowrap | 

|}

Missouri 

|-
! 
| Frank M. Karsten
|  | Democratic
| 1946
| Incumbent re-elected.
| nowrap | 

|-
! 
| Thomas B. Curtis
|  | Republican
| 1950
| Incumbent re-elected.
| nowrap | 

|-
! 
| Leonor Sullivan
|  | Democratic
| 1952
| Incumbent re-elected.
| nowrap | 

|-
! 
| William J. Randall
|  | Democratic
| 1959
| Incumbent re-elected.
| nowrap | 

|-
! 
| Richard Walker Bolling
|  | Democratic
| 1948
| Incumbent re-elected.
| nowrap | 

|-
! 
| William Raleigh Hull Jr.
|  | Democratic
| 1954
| Incumbent re-elected.
| nowrap | 

|-
! 
| Charles Harrison Brown
|  | Democratic
| 1956
|  | Incumbent lost re-election.New member elected.Republican gain.
| nowrap | 

|-
! 
| A. S. J. Carnahan
|  | Democratic
| 1948
|  | Incumbent lost renomination.New member elected.Democratic hold.
| nowrap | 

|-
! 
| Clarence Cannon
|  | Democratic
| 1922
| Incumbent re-elected.
| nowrap | 

|-
! 
| Paul C. Jones
|  | Democratic
| 1948
| Incumbent re-elected.
| nowrap | 

|-
! 
| Morgan M. Moulder
|  | Democratic
| 1948
| Incumbent re-elected.
| nowrap | 

|}

Montana 

|-
! 
| Lee Metcalf
|  | Democratic
| 1952
|  | Retired to run for U.S. senator.New member elected.Democratic hold.
| nowrap | 

|-
! 
| LeRoy H. Anderson
|  | Democratic
| 1956
|  | Retired to run for U.S. senator.New member elected.Republican gain.
| nowrap | 

|}

Nebraska 

|-
! 
| Phillip Hart Weaver
|  | Republican
| 1954
| Incumbent re-elected.
| nowrap | 

|-
! 
| Glenn Cunningham
|  | Republican
| 1956
| Incumbent re-elected.
| nowrap | 

|-
! 
| Lawrence Brock
|  | Democratic
| 1958
|  | Incumbent lost re-election.New member elected.Republican gain.
| nowrap | 

|-
! 
| Donald McGinley
|  | Democratic
| 1958
|  | Incumbent lost re-election.New member elected.Republican gain.
| nowrap | 

|}

Nevada 

|-
! 
| Walter S. Baring Jr.
|  | Democratic
| 19481952 1956
| Incumbent re-elected.
| nowrap | 

|}

New Hampshire 

|-
! 
| Chester Earl Merrow
|  | Republican
| 1942
| Incumbent re-elected.
| nowrap | 

|-
! 
| Perkins Bass
|  | Republican
| 1954
| Incumbent re-elected.
| nowrap | 

|}

New Jersey 

|-
! 
| William T. Cahill
|  | Republican
| 1958
| Incumbent re-elected.
| nowrap | 

|-
! 
| Milton W. Glenn
|  | Republican
| 1957
| Incumbent re-elected.
| nowrap | 

|-
! 
| James C. Auchincloss
|  | Republican
| 1942
| Incumbent re-elected.
| nowrap | 

|-
! 
| Frank Thompson
|  | Democratic
| 1954
| Incumbent re-elected.
| nowrap | 

|-
! 
| Peter Frelinghuysen Jr.
|  | Republican
| 1952
| Incumbent re-elected.
| nowrap | 

|-
! 
| Florence P. Dwyer
|  | Republican
| 1956
| Incumbent re-elected.
| nowrap | 

|-
! 
| William B. Widnall
|  | Republican
| 1950
| Incumbent re-elected.
| nowrap | 

|-
! 
| Gordon Canfield
|  | Republican
| 1940
|  | Incumbent retired.New member elected.Democratic gain.
| nowrap | 

|-
! 
| Frank C. Osmers Jr.
|  | Republican
| 1951
| Incumbent re-elected.
| nowrap | 

|-
! 
| Peter W. Rodino
|  | Democratic
| 1948
| Incumbent re-elected.
| nowrap | 

|-
! 
| Hugh Joseph Addonizio
|  | Democratic
| 1948
| Incumbent re-elected.
| nowrap | 

|-
! 
| George M. Wallhauser
|  | Republican
| 1958
| Incumbent re-elected.
| nowrap | 

|-
! 
| Cornelius Gallagher
|  | Democratic
| 1958
| Incumbent re-elected.
| nowrap | 

|-
! 
| Dominick V. Daniels
|  | Democratic
| 1958
| Incumbent re-elected.
| nowrap | 

|}

New Mexico 

|-
! 
| Joseph Montoya
|  | Democratic
| 1957
| Incumbent re-elected.
| rowspan=2 nowrap | 

|-
! 
| Thomas G. Morris
|  | Democratic
| 1958
| Incumbent re-elected.

|}

New York 

|-
! 
| Stuyvesant Wainwright
|  | Republican
| 1952
|  | Incumbent lost re-election.New member elected.Democratic gain.
| nowrap | 

|-
! 
| Steven Derounian
|  | Republican
| 1952
| Incumbent re-elected.
| nowrap | 

|-
! 
| Frank J. Becker
|  | Republican
| 1952
| Incumbent re-elected.
| nowrap | 

|-
! 
| Seymour Halpern
|  | Republican
| 1958
| Incumbent re-elected.
| nowrap | 

|-
! 
| Albert H. Bosch
|  | Republican
| 1952
|  | Retired to run for judge of Queens County court.New member elected.Democratic gain.
| nowrap | 

|-
! 
| Lester Holtzman
|  | Democratic
| 1952
| Incumbent re-elected.
| nowrap | 

|-
! 
| James J. Delaney
|  | Democratic
| 19441946 1948
| Incumbent re-elected.
| nowrap | 

|-
! 
| Victor Anfuso
|  | Democratic
| 1954
| Incumbent re-elected.
| nowrap | 

|-
! 
| Eugene James Keogh
|  | Democratic
| 1936
| Incumbent re-elected.
| nowrap | 

|-
! 
| Edna F. Kelly
|  | Democratic
| 1949
| Incumbent re-elected.
| nowrap | 

|-
! 
| Emanuel Celler
|  | Democratic
| 1922
| Incumbent re-elected.
| nowrap | 

|-
! 
| Francis E. Dorn
|  | Republican
| 1952
|  | Incumbent lost re-election.New member elected.Democratic gain.
| nowrap | 

|-
! 
| Abraham J. Multer
|  | Democratic
| 1947
| Incumbent re-elected.
| nowrap | 

|-
! 
| John J. Rooney
|  | Democratic
| 1944
| Incumbent re-elected.
| nowrap | 

|-
! 
| John H. Ray
|  | Republican
| 1952
| Incumbent re-elected.
| nowrap | 

|-
! 
| Adam Clayton Powell Jr.
|  | Democratic
| 1944
| Incumbent re-elected.
| nowrap | 

|-
! 
| John Lindsay
|  | Republican
| 1958
| Incumbent re-elected.
| nowrap | 

|-
! 
| Alfred E. Santangelo
|  | Democratic
| 1956
| Incumbent re-elected.
| nowrap | 

|-
! 
| Leonard Farbstein
|  | Democratic
| 1956
| Incumbent re-elected.
| nowrap | 

|-
! 
| Ludwig Teller
|  | Democratic
| 1956
|  | Incumbent lost renomination.New member elected.Defeated as LiberalDemocratic hold.
| nowrap | 

|-
! 
| Herbert Zelenko
|  | Democratic
| 1954
| Incumbent re-elected.
| nowrap | 

|-
! 
| James C. Healey
|  | Democratic
| 1956
| Incumbent re-elected.
| nowrap | 

|-
! 
| Jacob H. Gilbert
|  | Democratic
| March 8, 1960(Special)
| Incumbent re-elected.
| nowrap | 

|-
! 
| Charles A. Buckley
|  | Democratic
| 1934
| Incumbent re-elected.
| nowrap | 

|-
! 
| Paul A. Fino
|  | Republican
| 1952
| Incumbent re-elected.
| nowrap | 

|-
! 
| Edwin B. Dooley
|  | Republican
| 1956
| Incumbent re-elected.
| nowrap | 

|-
! 
| Robert R. Barry
|  | Republican
| 1958
| Incumbent re-elected.
| nowrap | 

|-
! 
| Katharine St. George
|  | Republican
| 1946
| Incumbent re-elected.
| nowrap | 

|-
! 
| J. Ernest Wharton
|  | Republican
| 1950
| Incumbent re-elected.
| nowrap | 

|-
! 
| Leo W. O'Brien
|  | Democratic
| 1952
| Incumbent re-elected.
| nowrap | 

|-
! 
| Dean P. Taylor
|  | Republican
| 1942
|  | Incumbent retired.New member elected.Republican hold.
| nowrap | 

|-
! 
| Samuel S. Stratton
|  | Democratic
| 1958
| Incumbent re-elected.
| nowrap | 

|-
! 
| Clarence E. Kilburn
|  | Republican
| 1940
| Incumbent re-elected.
| nowrap | 

|-
! 
| Alexander Pirnie
|  | Republican
| 1958
| Incumbent re-elected.
| nowrap | 

|-
! 
| R. Walter Riehlman
|  | Republican
| 1946
| Incumbent re-elected.
| nowrap | 

|-
! 
| John Taber
|  | Republican
| 1922
| Incumbent re-elected.
| nowrap | 

|-
! 
| Howard W. Robison
|  | Republican
| 1958
| Incumbent re-elected.
| nowrap | 

|-
! 
| Jessica M. Weis
|  | Republican
| 1958
| Incumbent re-elected.
| nowrap | 

|-
! 
| Harold C. Ostertag
|  | Republican
| 1950
| Incumbent re-elected.
| nowrap | 

|-
! 
| William E. Miller
|  | Republican
| 1950
| Incumbent re-elected.
| nowrap | 

|-
! 
| Thaddeus J. Dulski
|  | Democratic
| 1958
| Incumbent re-elected.
| nowrap | 

|-
! 
| John R. Pillion
|  | Republican
| 1952
| Incumbent re-elected.
| nowrap | 

|-
! 
| Charles Goodell
|  | Republican
| 1959
| Incumbent re-elected.
| nowrap | 

|}

North Carolina 

|-
! 
| Herbert Covington Bonner
|  | Democratic
| 1940
| Incumbent re-elected.
| nowrap | 

|-
! 
| Lawrence H. Fountain
|  | Democratic
| 1952
| Incumbent re-elected.
| nowrap | 

|-
! 
| Graham Arthur Barden
|  | Democratic
| 1934
|  | Incumbent retired.New member elected.Democratic hold.
| nowrap | 

|-
! 
| Harold D. Cooley
|  | Democratic
| 1934
| Incumbent re-elected.
| nowrap | 

|-
! 
| Ralph James Scott
|  | Democratic
| 1956
| Incumbent re-elected.
| nowrap | 

|-
! 
| Carl T. Durham
|  | Democratic
| 1938
|  | Incumbent retired.New member elected.Democratic hold.
| nowrap | 

|-
! 
| Alton Lennon
|  | Democratic
| 1956
| Incumbent re-elected.
| nowrap | 

|-
! 
| Alvin Paul Kitchin
|  | Democratic
| 1956
| Incumbent re-elected.
| nowrap | 

|-
! 
| Hugh Quincy Alexander
|  | Democratic
| 1952
| Incumbent re-elected.
| nowrap | 

|-
! 
| Charles R. Jonas
|  | Republican
| 1952
| Incumbent re-elected.
| nowrap | 

|-
! 
| Basil Lee Whitener
|  | Democratic
| 1956
| Incumbent re-elected.
| nowrap | 

|-
! 
| Roy A. Taylor
|  | Democratic
| June 25, 1960(Special)
| Incumbent re-elected.
| nowrap | 

|}

North Dakota 

|-
! 
| Don L. Short
|  | Republican
| 1958
| Incumbent re-elected.
| rowspan=2 nowrap | 

|-
! 
| Quentin Burdick
|  | Democratic
| 1958
|  | Incumbent resigned August 8, 1960 when elected U.S. senator.New member elected.Republican gain.

|}

Ohio 

|-
! 
| Gordon H. Scherer
|  | Republican
| 1952
| Incumbent re-elected.
| nowrap | 

|-
! 
| William E. Hess
|  | Republican
| 1950
|  | Incumbent retired.New member elected.Republican hold.
| nowrap | 

|-
! 
| Paul F. Schenck
|  | Republican
| 1951
| Incumbent re-elected.
| nowrap | 

|-
! 
| William Moore McCulloch
|  | Republican
| 1947
| Incumbent re-elected.
| nowrap | 

|-
! 
| Del Latta
|  | Republican
| 1958
| Incumbent re-elected.
| nowrap | 

|-
! 
| James G. Polk
|  | Democratic
| 1948
|  | Incumbent died April 28, 1959.New member elected.Republican gain.
| nowrap | 

|-
! 
| Clarence J. Brown
|  | Republican
| 1938
| Incumbent re-elected.
| nowrap | 

|-
! 
| Jackson Edward Betts
|  | Republican
| 1950
| Incumbent re-elected.
| nowrap | 

|-
! 
| Thomas L. Ashley
|  | Democratic
| 1954
| Incumbent re-elected.
| nowrap | 

|-
! 
| Walter H. Moeller
|  | Democratic
| 1958
| Incumbent re-elected.
| nowrap | 

|-
! 
| Robert E. Cook
|  | Democratic
| 1958
| Incumbent re-elected.
| nowrap | 

|-
! 
| Samuel L. Devine
|  | Republican
| 1958
| Incumbent re-elected.
| nowrap | 

|-
! 
| Albert David Baumhart Jr.
|  | Republican
| 1954
|  | Incumbent retired.New member elected.Republican hold.
| nowrap | 

|-
! 
| William Hanes Ayres
|  | Republican
| 1950
| Incumbent re-elected.
| nowrap | 

|-
! 
| John E. Henderson
|  | Republican
| 1954
|  | Incumbent retired.New member elected.Republican hold.
| nowrap | 

|-
! 
| Frank T. Bow
|  | Republican
| 1950
| Incumbent re-elected.
| nowrap | 

|-
! 
| Robert W. Levering
|  | Democratic
| 1958
|  | Incumbent lost re-election.New member elected.Republican gain.
| nowrap | 

|-
! 
| Wayne L. Hays
|  | Democratic
| 1948
| Incumbent re-elected.
| nowrap | 

|-
! 
| Michael J. Kirwan
|  | Democratic
| 1936
| Incumbent re-elected.
| nowrap | 

|-
! 
| Michael A. Feighan
|  | Democratic
| 1942
| Incumbent re-elected.
| nowrap | 

|-
! 
| Charles Vanik
|  | Democratic
| 1954
| Incumbent re-elected.
| nowrap | 

|-
! 
| Frances P. Bolton
|  | Republican
| 1940
| Incumbent re-elected.
| nowrap | 

|-
! 
| William Edwin Minshall Jr.
|  | Republican
| 1954
| Incumbent re-elected.
| nowrap | 

|}

Oklahoma 

|-
! 
| Page Belcher
|  | Republican
| 1950
| Incumbent re-elected.
| nowrap | 

|-
! 
| Ed Edmondson
|  | Democratic
| 1952
| Incumbent re-elected.
| nowrap | 

|-
! 
| Carl Albert
|  | Democratic
| 1946
| Incumbent re-elected.
| nowrap | 

|-
! 
| Tom Steed
|  | Democratic
| 1948
| Incumbent re-elected.
| nowrap | 

|-
! 
| John Jarman
|  | Democratic
| 1950
| Incumbent re-elected.
| nowrap | 

|-
! 
| Toby Morris
|  | Democratic
| 1956
|  | Incumbent lost renomination.New member elected.Democratic hold.
| nowrap | 

|}

Oregon 

|-
! 
| A. Walter Norblad
|  | Republican
| 1946
| Incumbent re-elected.
| nowrap | 

|-
! 
| Al Ullman
|  | Democratic
| 1956
| Incumbent re-elected.
| nowrap | 

|-
! 
| Edith Green
|  | Democratic
| 1954
| Incumbent re-elected.
| nowrap | 

|-
! 
| Charles O. Porter
|  | Democratic
| 1956
|  | Incumbent lost re-election.New member elected.Republican gain.
| nowrap | 

|}

Pennsylvania 

|-
! 
| William A. Barrett
|  | Democratic
| 19441946 1948
| Incumbent re-elected.
| nowrap | 

|-
! 
| Kathryn E. Granahan
|  | Democratic
| 1956
| Incumbent re-elected.
| nowrap | 

|-
! 
| James A. Byrne
|  | Democratic
| 1952
| Incumbent re-elected.
| nowrap | 

|-
! 
| Robert N. C. Nix Sr.
|  | Democratic
| 1958
| Incumbent re-elected.
| nowrap | 

|-
! 
| William J. Green Jr.
|  | Democratic
| 1944
| Incumbent re-elected.
| nowrap | 

|-
! 
| Herman Toll
|  | Democratic
| 1958
| Incumbent re-elected.
| nowrap | 

|-
! 
| William H. Milliken Jr.
|  | Republican
| 1958
| Incumbent re-elected.
| nowrap | 

|-
! 
| Willard S. Curtin
|  | Republican
| 1956
| Incumbent re-elected.
| nowrap | 

|-
! 
| Paul B. Dague
|  | Republican
| 1946
| Incumbent re-elected.
| nowrap | 

|-
! 
| Stanley A. Prokop
|  | Democratic
| 1958
|  | Incumbent lost re-election.New member elected.Republican gain.
| nowrap | 

|-
! 
| Dan Flood
|  | Democratic
| 19441946 19481952 1954
| Incumbent re-elected.
| nowrap | 

|-
! 
| Ivor D. Fenton
|  | Republican
| 1938
| Incumbent re-elected.
| nowrap | 

|-
! 
| John A. Lafore Jr.
|  | Republican
| 1956
|  | Incumbent lost renomination.New member elected.Republican hold.
| nowrap | 

|-
! 
| George M. Rhodes
|  | Democratic
| 1948
| Incumbent re-elected.
| nowrap | 

|-
! 
| Francis E. Walter
|  | Democratic
| 1932
| Incumbent re-elected.
| nowrap | 

|-
! 
| Walter M. Mumma
|  | Republican
| 1950
| Incumbent re-elected.
| nowrap | 

|-
! 
| Herman T. Schneebeli
|  | Republican
| April 26, 1960(Special)
| Incumbent re-elected.
| nowrap | 

|-
! 
| Douglas Hemphill Elliott
|  | Republican
| 1960 
|  | Incumbent died June 19, 1960.New member elected.Republican hold.Winner was also elected to finish the term, see above.
| nowrap | 

|-
! 
| James M. Quigley
|  | Democratic
| 1958
|  | Incumbent lost re-election.New member elected.Republican gain.
| nowrap | 

|-
! 
| James E. Van Zandt
|  | Republican
| 1946
| Incumbent re-elected.
| nowrap | 

|-
! 
| John Herman Dent
|  | Democratic
| 1958
| Incumbent re-elected.
| nowrap | 

|-
! 
| John P. Saylor
|  | Republican
| 1948
| Incumbent re-elected.
| nowrap | 

|-
! 
| Leon H. Gavin
|  | Republican
| 1942
| Incumbent re-elected.
| nowrap | 

|-
! 
| Carroll D. Kearns
|  | Republican
| 1946
| Incumbent re-elected.
| nowrap | 

|-
! 
| Frank M. Clark
|  | Democratic
| 1954
| Incumbent re-elected.
| nowrap | 

|-
! 
| Thomas E. Morgan
|  | Democratic
| 1944
| Incumbent re-elected.
| nowrap | 

|-
! 
| James G. Fulton
|  | Republican
| 1944
| Incumbent re-elected.
| nowrap | 

|-
! 
| William S. Moorhead
|  | Democratic
| 1958
| Incumbent re-elected.
| nowrap | 

|-
! 
| Robert J. Corbett
|  | Republican
| 19381940 1944
| Incumbent re-elected.
| nowrap | 

|-
! 
| Elmer J. Holland
|  | Democratic
| 1942 1942 1956 
| Incumbent re-elected.
| nowrap | 

|}

Rhode Island 

|-
! 
| Aime Forand
|  | Democratic
| 1940
|  | Incumbent retired.New member elected.Democratic hold.
| nowrap | 

|-
! 
| John E. Fogarty
|  | Democratic
| 1940
| Incumbent re-elected.
| nowrap | 

|}

South Carolina 

|-
! 
| L. Mendel Rivers
|  | Democratic
| 1940
| Incumbent re-elected.
| nowrap | 

|-
! 
| John J. Riley
|  | Democratic
| 1950
| Incumbent re-elected.
| nowrap | 

|-
! 
| William Jennings Bryan Dorn
|  | Democratic
| 19461948 1950
| Incumbent re-elected.
| nowrap | 

|-
! 
| Robert T. Ashmore
|  | Democratic
| 1953
| Incumbent re-elected.
| nowrap | 

|-
! 
| Robert W. Hemphill
|  | Democratic
| 1956
| Incumbent re-elected.
| nowrap | 

|-
! 
| John L. McMillan
|  | Democratic
| 1938
| Incumbent re-elected.
| nowrap | 

|}

South Dakota 

|-
! 
| George McGovern
|  | Democratic
| 1956
|  | Retired to run for U.S. senator.New member elected.Republican gain.
| nowrap | 

|-
! 
| Ellis Yarnal Berry
|  | Republican
| 1950
| Incumbent re-elected.
| nowrap | 

|}

Tennessee 

|-
! 
| B. Carroll Reece
|  | Republican
| 1950
| Incumbent re-elected.
| nowrap | 

|-
! 
| Howard Baker Sr.
|  | Republican
| 1950
| Incumbent re-elected.
| nowrap | 

|-
! 
| James B. Frazier Jr.
|  | Democratic
| 1948
| Incumbent re-elected.
| nowrap | 

|-
! 
| Joe L. Evins
|  | Democratic
| 1946
| Incumbent re-elected.
| nowrap | 

|-
! 
| Joseph Carlton Loser
|  | Democratic
| 1956
| Incumbent re-elected.
| nowrap | 

|-
! 
| Ross Bass
|  | Democratic
| 1954
| Incumbent re-elected.
| nowrap | 

|-
! 
| Tom J. Murray
|  | Democratic
| 1942
| Incumbent re-elected.
| nowrap | 

|-
! 
| Fats Everett
|  | Democratic
| 1958
| Incumbent re-elected.
| nowrap | 

|-
! 
| Clifford Davis
|  | Democratic
| 1940
| Incumbent re-elected.
| nowrap | 

|}

Texas 

|-
! 
| Wright Patman
|  | Democratic
| 1928
| Incumbent re-elected.
| nowrap | 

|-
! 
| Jack Brooks
|  | Democratic
| 1952
| Incumbent re-elected.
| nowrap | 

|-
! 
| Lindley Beckworth
|  | Democratic
| 1956
| Incumbent re-elected.
| nowrap | 

|-
! 
| Sam Rayburn
|  | Democratic
| 1912
| Incumbent re-elected.
| nowrap | 

|-
! 
| Bruce R. Alger
|  | Republican
| 1954
| Incumbent re-elected.
| nowrap | 

|-
! 
| Olin E. Teague
|  | Democratic
| 1946
| Incumbent re-elected.
| nowrap | 

|-
! 
| John Dowdy
|  | Democratic
| 1952
| Incumbent re-elected.
| nowrap | 

|-
! 
| Albert Thomas
|  | Democratic
| 1936
| Incumbent re-elected.
| nowrap | 

|-
! 
| Clark W. Thompson
|  | Democratic
| 1947
| Incumbent re-elected.
| nowrap | 

|-
! 
| Homer Thornberry
|  | Democratic
| 1948
| Incumbent re-elected.
| nowrap | 

|-
! 
| William R. Poage
|  | Democratic
| 1936
| Incumbent re-elected.
| nowrap | 

|-
! 
| Jim Wright
|  | Democratic
| 1954
| Incumbent re-elected.
| nowrap | 

|-
! 
| Frank N. Ikard
|  | Democratic
| 1951
| Incumbent re-elected.
| nowrap | 

|-
! 
| John Andrew Young
|  | Democratic
| 1956
| Incumbent re-elected.
| nowrap | 

|-
! 
| Joe M. Kilgore
|  | Democratic
| 1954
| Incumbent re-elected.
| nowrap | 

|-
! 
| J. T. Rutherford
|  | Democratic
| 1954
| Incumbent re-elected.
| nowrap | 

|-
! 
| Omar Burleson
|  | Democratic
| 1946
| Incumbent re-elected.
| nowrap | 

|-
! 
| Walter E. Rogers
|  | Democratic
| 1950
| Incumbent re-elected.
| nowrap | 

|-
! 
| George H. Mahon
|  | Democratic
| 1934
| Incumbent re-elected.
| nowrap | 

|-
! 
| Paul J. Kilday
|  | Democratic
| 1938
| Incumbent re-elected.
| nowrap | 

|-
! 
| O. C. Fisher
|  | Democratic
| 1942
| Incumbent re-elected.
| nowrap | 

|-
! 
| Robert R. Casey
|  | Democratic
| 1958
| Incumbent re-elected.
| nowrap | 

|}

Utah 

|-
! 
| Henry Aldous Dixon
|  | Republican
| 1954
|  | Incumbent retired.New member elected.Democratic gain.
| nowrap | 

|-
! 
| David S. King
|  | Democratic
| 1958
| Incumbent re-elected.
| nowrap | 

|}

Vermont 

|-
! 
| William H. Meyer
|  | Democratic
| 1958
|  | Incumbent lost re-election.New member elected.Republican gain.
| nowrap | 

|}

Virginia 

|-
! 
| Thomas N. Downing
|  | Democratic
| 1958
| Incumbent re-elected.
| nowrap | 

|-
! 
| Porter Hardy Jr.
|  | Democratic
| 1946
| Incumbent re-elected.
| nowrap | 

|-
! 
| J. Vaughan Gary
|  | Democratic
| 1945
| Incumbent re-elected.
| nowrap | 

|-
! 
| Watkins Moorman Abbitt
|  | Democratic
| 1948
| Incumbent re-elected.
| nowrap | 

|-
! 
| William M. Tuck
|  | Democratic
| 1953
| Incumbent re-elected.
| nowrap | 

|-
! 
| Richard Harding Poff
|  | Republican
| 1952
| Incumbent re-elected.
| nowrap | 

|-
! 
| Burr Harrison
|  | Democratic
| 1946
| Incumbent re-elected.
| nowrap | 

|-
! 
| Howard W. Smith
|  | Democratic
| 1930
| Incumbent re-elected.
| nowrap | 

|-
! 
| W. Pat Jennings
|  | Democratic
| 1954
| Incumbent re-elected.
| nowrap | 

|-
! 
| Joel Broyhill
|  | Republican
| 1952
| Incumbent re-elected.
| nowrap | 

|}

Washington 

|-
! 
| Thomas Pelly
|  | Republican
| 1952
| Incumbent re-elected.
| nowrap | 

|-
! 
| Jack Westland
|  | Republican
| 1952
| Incumbent re-elected.
| nowrap | 

|-
! 
| Russell V. Mack
|  | Republican
| 1947 
|  | Incumbent died March 28, 1960.New member elected.Democratic gain.Winner was also elected to finish the term, see above.
| nowrap | 

|-
! 
| Catherine Dean May
|  | Republican
| 1958
| Incumbent re-elected.
| nowrap | 

|-
! 
| Walt Horan
|  | Republican
| 1942
| Incumbent re-elected.
| nowrap | 

|-
! 
| Thor C. Tollefson
|  | Republican
| 1946
| Incumbent re-elected.
| nowrap | 

|-
! 
| Donald H. Magnuson
|  | Democratic
| 1952
| Incumbent re-elected.
| nowrap | 

|}

West Virginia 

|-
! 
| Arch A. Moore Jr.
|  | Republican
| 1956
| Incumbent re-elected.
| nowrap | 

|-
! 
| Harley Orrin Staggers
|  | Democratic
| 1948
| Incumbent re-elected.
| nowrap | 

|-
! 
| Cleveland M. Bailey
|  | Democratic
| 1948
| Incumbent re-elected.
| nowrap | 

|-
! 
| Ken Hechler
|  | Democratic
| 1958
| Incumbent re-elected.
| nowrap | 

|-
! 
| Elizabeth Kee
|  | Democratic
| 1951 
| Incumbent re-elected.
| nowrap | 

|-
! 
| John M. Slack Jr.
|  | Democratic
| 1958
| Incumbent re-elected.
| nowrap | 

|}

Wisconsin 

|-
! 
| Gerald T. Flynn
|  | Democratic
| 1958
|  | Incumbent lost re-election.New member elected.Republican gain.
| nowrap | 

|-
! 
| Robert Kastenmeier
|  | Democratic
| 1958
| Incumbent re-elected.
| nowrap | 

|-
! 
| Gardner R. Withrow
|  | Republican
| 1948
|  | Incumbent retired.New member elected.Republican hold.
| nowrap | 

|-
! 
| Clement J. Zablocki
|  | Democratic
| 1948
| Incumbent re-elected.
| nowrap | 

|-
! 
| Henry S. Reuss
|  | Democratic
| 1954
| Incumbent re-elected.
| nowrap | 

|-
! 
| William Van Pelt
|  | Republican
| 1950
| Incumbent re-elected.
| nowrap | 

|-
! 
| Melvin Laird
|  | Republican
| 1952
| Incumbent re-elected.
| nowrap | 

|-
! 
| John W. Byrnes
|  | Republican
| 1944
| Incumbent re-elected.
| nowrap | 

|-
! 
| Lester Johnson
|  | Democratic
| 1953
| Incumbent re-elected.
| nowrap | 

|-
! 
| Alvin O'Konski
|  | Republican
| 1942
| Incumbent re-elected.
| nowrap | 

|}

Wyoming 

|-
! 
| Edwin Keith Thomson
|  | Republican
| 1954
|  | Retired to run for U.S. senator.New member elected.Republican hold.
| nowrap | 

|}

See also
 1960 United States elections
 1960 United States Senate elections
 86th United States Congress
 87th United States Congress

References